George Thornewell Smith (October 15, 1916 – August 23, 2010) was an American Democratic Party politician and jurist from the state of Georgia. The sixth Lieutenant Governor, state legislator, Speaker of the State House of Representatives, was the only person in Georgia to win contested elections in all three branches of state government - legislative, executive, and judicial.

Early years
Born in Mitchell County, Georgia, Smith attended Middle Georgia College and Abraham Baldwin Agricultural College. On August 26, 1940, he joined the United States Navy, having attained the rank of lieutenant commander and receiving the Naval Merit Unit citation. Following military service, Smith graduated from the University of Georgia School of Law in 1948.

Upon graduation he practiced law in Cairo in Grady County in southwestern Georgia. In addition to his private law practice, he served as county attorney, solicitor of the State Court of Grady County, Cairo city attorney, and attorney for the Grady County Board of Education.

Political career
Smith's political career began when he was elected to the Georgia House of Representatives from Grady County in 1958. He served as a state representative until 1966, eventually rising to the position of its Speaker from 1963 to 1966.

Smith won the Democratic Party nomination for lieutenant governor in the 1966 election. Because the Georgia Democratic Party dominated state politics at the time, winning the primary virtually assured victory in the general election. Smith served as the state's second-ranking executive officer under Governor Lester Maddox from January 11, 1967 to January 12, 1971. Smith was defeated for re-election as lieutenant governor by Maddox in 1970, as Maddox was prohibited from seeking re-election to the governorship, which then passed to Jimmy Carter of Plains.

After leaving office, Smith returned to the legal world, initially in private practice in Marietta in suburban Cobb County near Atlanta. He ran unsuccessfully for governor in 1974, having lost his party nomination to George Busbee. In 1976, he was elected to the Georgia Court of Appeals for a six-year term. In 1980, he was elected as a justice of the Georgia Supreme Court. He served on the high court from 1981 until 1991. Despite his advanced age at the time of his death, Smith was serving on the Executive Committee of the Appellate Judges Conference.

Smith's portrait was unveiled in the rotunda of the State Capitol in Atlanta on May 12, 1980, in accordance with a Joint Resolution passed by the Georgia House and Senate.

Smith was also District Governor of the Georgia Kiwanis in 1960 and has served on the board of trustees of the National Arthritis Foundation and as chairman of its National Government Affairs Committee.

Smith was called "George T." to distinguish himself from a Georgia politician with a similar name, George L. Smith, who served as Speaker of the Georgia House during much of the 1960s and early 1970s.

See also
 List of speakers of the Georgia House of Representatives

References

External links
Biography with photo
Georgia State University Library
"George T. Smith has grown accustomed to standing out in a crowd," The Advocate, University of Georgia School of Law

1916 births
2010 deaths
Lieutenant Governors of Georgia (U.S. state)
Justices of the Supreme Court of Georgia (U.S. state)
Georgia Court of Appeals judges
University of Georgia alumni
Middle Georgia College alumni
Speakers of the Georgia House of Representatives
Democratic Party members of the Georgia House of Representatives
20th-century American judges